The 1951–52 season was Colchester United's tenth season in their history and their second season in the Third Division South, the third tier of English football. Alongside competing in the Third Division South, the club also participated in the FA Cup. Colchester reached the third round of the FA Cup before being knocked out by Second Division side Barnsley. In the league, they bettered the previous season's 16th-placed finish by finishing 10th.

Season overview
Colchester's 1951–52 season began poorly, with six defeats in the opening seven games due to an injury-ravaged squad. Rooted to the foot of the table, a mid-season revival including a double over local rivals Ipswich Town eventually saw the U's finish the season 10th in the final standings.

Vic Keeble became Colchester's first export that commanded a high transfer fee when he moved to First Division Newcastle United for a £15,000 fee in January 1952. Despite his mid-season sale, Keeble remained the top scorer for the U's with 17 goals. Manager Jimmy Allen signed Kevin McCurley from Liverpool for £750 as a replacement for Keeble in March 1952. He scored six times in eleven games during the final two months of the campaign.

Players

Transfers

In

 Total spending:  ~ £4,200

Out

 Total incoming:  ~ £15,000

Match details

Third Division South

Results round by round

League table

Matches

FA Cup

Squad statistics

Appearances and goals

|-
!colspan="14"|Players who appeared for Colchester who left during the season

|}

Goalscorers

Disciplinary record

Clean sheets
Number of games goalkeepers kept a clean sheet.

Player debuts
Players making their first-team Colchester United debut in a fully competitive match.

See also
List of Colchester United F.C. seasons

References

General
Books

Websites

Specific

1951-52
English football clubs 1951–52 season